Barbara Livi (born 5 May 1973) is an Italian actress of cinema, television, and theatre. She is best known for her role of Martina Morante in the 5th sequel of the long-running drama series Incantesimo, which was televised on Rai Uno.

Early life 
Livi was born in Rome, Italy on 5 May 1973.

Career 
In 1997 she appeared in the film Stressati directed by Mauro Cappelloni.

Her most notable performance was in the role of Martina Morante in 2002, in the fifth season of the television drama Incantesimo, which first aired in 1997, and as of 2008 was still running. She also acted in the series Un Medico in Famiglia in which she played the part of Eloisa Gherarducci. In spring 2009, she had a role in the television film L'uomo che cavalcava nel buio, which starred Terence Hill. In winter 2009, she had a role in Un caso di coscienza 4; in autumn 2010, she performed in Paura di amare, a Rai Uno television miniseries. The following year, she had a role in another Rai Uno television miniseries La donna che ritorna.

Livi also features in many commercials and has worked as a fashion model for designer Lorenzo Riva.

References

External links

1973 births
Living people
Italian film actresses
Italian television actresses
Italian stage actresses
Actresses from Rome
Italian female models
20th-century Italian actresses
21st-century Italian actresses